Maly Prisynok is a rural locality (a settlement) in Starooskolsky District, Belgorod Oblast, Russia. The population was 50 as of 2010. There are 3 streets.

Geography 
Maly Prisynok is located 33 km southeast of Stary Oskol (the district's administrative centre) by road. Ternovoye is the nearest rural locality.

References 

Rural localities in Starooskolsky District